Kai Wucherpfennig is a German-American biologist currently at the Dana–Farber Cancer Institute and an Elected Fellow of the American Association for the Advancement of Science.

References

Year of birth missing (living people)
Living people
Fellows of the American Association for the Advancement of Science
21st-century American biologists